The Botswana Basketball Association (BBA) is the premier basketball league for clubs in Botswana. The league consist out of twelve teams. As of December 2019, the defending champions are Dolphins.

The champions of the BBL are able to play in the qualifying rounds of the Basketball Africa League (BAL).

History 
Basketball in Botswana was played informally by mission schools from 1965. In the early 1990s, the first organised games were played. In 1995, the Botswana Basketball Association (BBA) was founded.

Current teams 
The following were the twelve teams for the 2019 season:
Dolphins
Troopers
Spartans
Flames
BDF V
Cadets
Bullets
Police
Saints
Splinters
Warriors

Champions 

 2009: Troopers
 2010: Troopers
 2011: unknown
 2012: unknown
 2013: Troopers
 2014: Troopers 
 2015:Dolphins
 2016: unknown
 2017: Dolphins
 2018: Dolphins
 2019: unknown
 2020: Not held
 2021: Not held

Finals

References

External links
Botswana at AfroBasket.com

Basketball in Botswana
Basketball leagues in Africa
Sports leagues in Botswana